Marico-Bosveld Dam is a homogeneous earth-fill type dam located on the Marico River, near Groot Marico, North West, South Africa. The dam was established in 1933 and serves mainly for irrigation purposes. The hazard potential of the dam has been ranked high (3).

The dam was built during the Great Depression of 1933. 75% of the labour was white and 25% was black. The main engineer on the project was Timothy d’Oliveira. The dam was built to provide work and income to people at the time.

See all the List of reservoirs and dams in South Africa
List of rivers of South Africa

References (good) 

 List of South African Dams from the South African Department of Water Affairs

Dams in South Africa
Dams completed in 1933